Sir Thomas More (7 February 1478 – 6 July 1535), venerated in the Catholic Church as Saint Thomas More, was an English lawyer, judge, social philosopher, author, statesman, and noted Renaissance humanist. He also served Henry VIII as Lord High Chancellor of England from October 1529 to May 1532. He wrote Utopia, published in 1516, which describes the political system of an imaginary island state.

More opposed the Protestant Reformation, directing polemics against the theology of Martin Luther, Huldrych Zwingli, John Calvin and William Tyndale. More also opposed Henry VIII's separation from the Catholic Church, refusing to acknowledge Henry as supreme head of the Church of England and the annulment of his marriage to Catherine of Aragon. After refusing to take the Oath of Supremacy, he was convicted of treason and executed. On his execution, he was reported to have said: "I die the King's good servant, and God's first".

Pope Pius XI canonised More in 1935 as a martyr. Pope John Paul II in 2000 declared him the patron saint of statesmen and politicians.

Early life 

Born on Milk Street in the City of London, on 7 February 1478, Thomas More was the son of Sir John More, a successful lawyer and later a judge, and his wife Agnes (née Graunger). He was the second of six children. More was educated at St. Anthony's School, then considered one of London's best schools. From 1490 to 1492, More served John Morton, the Archbishop of Canterbury and Lord Chancellor of England, as a household page.

Morton enthusiastically supported the "New Learning" (scholarship which was later known as "humanism" or "London humanism"), and thought highly of the young More. Believing that More had great potential, Morton nominated him for a place at the University of Oxford (either in St. Mary Hall or Canterbury College, both now gone).

More began his studies at Oxford in 1492, and received a classical education. Studying under Thomas Linacre and William Grocyn, he became proficient in both Latin and Greek. More left Oxford after only two years—at his father's insistence—to begin legal training in London at New Inn, one of the Inns of Chancery. In 1496, More became a student at Lincoln's Inn, one of the Inns of Court, where he remained until 1502, when he was called to the Bar.

Spiritual life 
According to his friend, the theologian Desiderius Erasmus of Rotterdam, More once seriously contemplated abandoning his legal career to become a monk. Between 1503 and 1504 More lived near the Carthusian monastery outside the walls of London and joined in the monks' spiritual exercises. Although he deeply admired their piety, More ultimately decided to remain a layman, standing for election to Parliament in 1504 and marrying the following year.

More continued ascetic practices for the rest of his life, such as wearing a hair shirt next to his skin and occasionally engaging in self-flagellation. A tradition of the Third Order of Saint Francis honours More as a member of that Order on their calendar of saints.

Family life 

More married Jane Colt in 1505. In that year he leased a portion of a house known as the Old Barge (originally there had been a wharf nearby serving the Walbrook river) on Bucklersbury, St Stephen Walbrook parish, London. Eight years later he took over the rest of the house and in total he lived there for almost 20 years, until his move to Chelsea in 1525. Erasmus reported that More wanted to give his young wife a better education than she had previously received at home, and tutored her in music and literature. The couple had four children: Margaret, Elizabeth, Cicely, and John. Jane died in 1511.

Going "against friends' advice and common custom," within 30 days, More had married one of the many eligible women among his wide circle of friends. He chose Alice Middleton, a widow, to head his household and care for his small children. The speed of the marriage was so unusual that More had to get a dispensation from the banns of marriage, which, due to his good public reputation, he easily obtained.

More had no children from his second marriage, although he raised Alice's daughter from her previous marriage as his own. More also became the guardian of two young girls: Anne Cresacre who would eventually marry his son, John More; and Margaret Giggs (later Clement) who was the only member of his family to witness his execution (she died on the 35th anniversary of that execution, and her daughter married More's nephew William Rastell). An affectionate father, More wrote letters to his children whenever he was away on legal or government business, and encouraged them to write to him often.

More insisted upon giving his daughters the same classical education as his son, an unusual attitude at the time. His eldest daughter, Margaret, attracted much admiration for her erudition, especially her fluency in Greek and Latin. More told his daughter of his pride in her academic accomplishments in September 1522, after he showed the bishop a letter she had written:

More's decision to educate his daughters set an example for other noble families. Even Erasmus became much more favourable once he witnessed their accomplishments.

A portrait of More and his family, Sir Thomas More and Family, was painted by Holbein; however, it was lost in a fire in the 18th century. More's grandson commissioned a copy, of which two versions survive.

Early political career 

In 1504 More was elected to Parliament to represent Great Yarmouth, and in 1510 began representing London.

From 1510, More served as one of the two undersheriffs of the City of London, a position of considerable responsibility in which he earned a reputation as an honest and effective public servant. More became Master of Requests in 1514, the same year in which he was appointed as a Privy Counsellor. After undertaking a diplomatic mission to the Holy Roman Emperor, Charles V, accompanying Thomas Wolsey, Cardinal Archbishop of York, to Calais and Bruges, More was knighted and made under-treasurer of the Exchequer in 1521.

As secretary and personal adviser to King Henry VIII, More became increasingly influential: welcoming foreign diplomats, drafting official documents, and serving as a liaison between the King and Lord Chancellor Wolsey. More later served as High Steward for the Universities of Oxford and Cambridge.

In 1523 More was elected as knight of the shire (MP) for Middlesex and, on Wolsey's recommendation, the House of Commons elected More its Speaker. In 1525 More became Chancellor of the Duchy of Lancaster, with executive and judicial responsibilities over much of northern England.

Chancellorship 
After Wolsey fell, More succeeded to the office of Lord Chancellor in 1529. He dispatched cases with unprecedented rapidity.

Campaign against the Protestant Reformation 

More supported the Catholic Church and saw the Protestant Reformation as heresy, a threat to the unity of both church and society. More believed in the theology, argumentation, and ecclesiastical laws of the church, and "heard Luther's call to destroy the Catholic Church as a call to war."

His early actions against the Protestant Reformation included aiding Wolsey in preventing Lutheran books from being imported into England, spying on and investigating suspected Protestants, especially publishers, and arresting anyone holding in his possession, transporting, or distributing Bibles and other materials of the Protestant Reformation. Additionally, More vigorously suppressed Tyndale's English translation of the New Testament.

The Tyndale Bible used controversial translations of certain words that More considered heretical and seditious; for example, "senior" and "elder" rather than "priest" for the Greek , and "congregation" instead of "church." He also pointed out that some of the marginal glosses challenged Catholic doctrine. It was during this time that most of his literary polemics appeared.

Many accounts circulated during and after More's lifetime regarding persecution of the Protestant "heretics" during his time as Lord Chancellor. The popular sixteenth-century English Protestant historian John Foxe was instrumental in publicising accusations of torture in his Book of Martyrs, claiming that More had often personally used violence or torture while interrogating heretics. Later authors such as Brian Moynahan and Michael Farris cite Foxe when repeating these allegations, although Diarmaid MacCulloch, while acknowledging More's "relish for burning heretics", finds no evidence that he was directly involved. During More's chancellorship, six people were burned at the stake for heresy; they were Thomas Hitton, Thomas Bilney, Richard Bayfield, John Tewkesbury, Thomas Dusgate, and James Bainham. Moynahan argued that More was influential in the burning of Tyndale, as More's agents had long pursued him, even though this took place over a year after his own death.

Peter Ackroyd also lists claims from Foxe's Book of Martyrs and other post-Reformation sources that More "tied heretics to a tree in his Chelsea garden and whipped them", that "he watched as 'newe men' were put upon the rack in the Tower and tortured until they confessed", and that "he was personally responsible for the burning of several of the 'brethren' in Smithfield." Richard Marius records a similar claim, which tells about James Bainham, and writes that "the story Foxe told of Bainham's whipping and racking at More's hands is universally doubted today". More himself denied these allegations:

More instead claimed in his "Apology" (1533) that he only applied corporal punishment to two heretics: a child who was caned in front of his family for heresy regarding the Eucharist, and a "feeble-minded" man who was whipped for disrupting the mass by raising women's skirts over their heads at the moment of consecration.

Burning at the stake had been a standard punishment for heresy: 30 burnings had taken place in the century before More's elevation to Chancellor, and burning continued to be used by both Catholics and Protestants during the religious upheaval of the following decades. Ackroyd notes that More zealously "approved of burning". Marius maintains that More did everything in his power to bring about the extermination of the Protestant "heretics".

John Tewkesbury was a London leather seller found guilty by the Bishop of London John Stokesley of harbouring English translated New Testaments; he was sentenced to burning for refusing to recant. More declared: he "burned as there was neuer wretche I wene better worthy." After Richard Bayfield was also executed for distributing Tyndale's Bibles, More commented that he was "well and worthely burned".

Modern commentators are divided over More's religious actions as Chancellor. Some biographers, including Ackroyd, have taken a relatively tolerant view of More's campaign against Protestantism by placing his actions within the turbulent religious climate of the time and the threat of deadly catastrophes such as the German Peasants' Revolt, which More blamed on Luther, as did many others, such as Erasmus. Others have been more critical, such as Richard Marius, an American scholar of the Reformation, believing that such persecutions were a betrayal of More's earlier humanist convictions, including More's zealous and well-documented advocacy of extermination for Protestants.

Some Protestants take a different view. In 1980, More was added to the Church of England's calendar of Saints and Heroes of the Christian Church, despite being a fierce opponent of the English Reformation that created the Church of England. He was added jointly with John Fisher, to be commemorated every 6 July (the date of More's execution) as "Thomas More, scholar, and John Fisher, Bishop of Rochester, Reformation Martyrs, 1535". Pope John Paul II honoured him by making him patron saint of statesmen and politicians in October 2000, stating: "It can be said that he demonstrated in a singular way the value of a moral conscience ... even if, in his actions against heretics, he reflected the limits of the culture of his time".

Resignation 
As the conflict over supremacy between the Papacy and the King reached its peak, More continued to remain steadfast in supporting the supremacy of the Pope as Successor of Peter over that of the King of England. Parliament's reinstatement of the charge of praemunire in 1529 had made it a crime to support in public or office the claim of any authority outside the realm (such as the Papacy) to have a legal jurisdiction superior to the King's.

In 1530, More refused to sign a letter by the leading English churchmen and aristocrats asking Pope Clement VII to annul Henry's marriage to Catherine of Aragon, and also quarrelled with Henry VIII over the heresy laws. In 1531, a royal decree required the clergy to take an oath acknowledging the King as Supreme Head of the Church of England. The bishops at the Convocation of Canterbury in 1532 agreed to sign the Oath but only under threat of praemunire and only after these words were added: "as far as the law of Christ allows".

This was considered to be the final Submission of the Clergy. Cardinal John Fisher and some other clergy refused to sign. Henry purged most clergy who supported the papal stance from senior positions in the church. More continued to refuse to sign the Oath of Supremacy and did not agree to support the annulment of Henry's marriage to Catherine. However, he did not openly reject the King's actions and kept his opinions private.

On 16 May 1532, More resigned from his role as Chancellor but remained in Henry's favour despite his refusal. His decision to resign was caused by the decision of the convocation of the English Church, which was under intense royal threat, on the day before.

Indictment, trial and execution 
In 1533, More refused to attend the coronation of Anne Boleyn as the Queen of England. Technically, this was not an act of treason, as More had written to Henry seemingly acknowledging Anne's queenship and expressing his desire for the King's happiness and the new Queen's health. Despite this, his refusal to attend was widely interpreted as a snub against Anne, and Henry took action against him.

Shortly thereafter, More was charged with accepting bribes, but the charges had to be dismissed for lack of any evidence. In early 1534, More was accused by Thomas Cromwell of having given advice and counsel to the "Holy Maid of Kent," Elizabeth Barton, a nun who had prophesied that the king had ruined his soul and would come to a quick end for having divorced Queen Catherine. This was a month after Barton had confessed, which was possibly done under royal pressure, and was said to be concealment of treason.

Though it was dangerous for anyone to have anything to do with Barton, More had indeed met her, and was impressed by her fervour. But More was prudent and told her not to interfere with state matters. More was called before a committee of the Privy Council to answer these charges of treason, and after his respectful answers the matter seemed to have been dropped.

On 13 April 1534, More was asked to appear before a commission and swear his allegiance to the parliamentary Act of Succession. More accepted Parliament's right to declare Anne Boleyn the legitimate Queen of England, though he refused "the spiritual validity of the king's second marriage", and, holding fast to the teaching of papal supremacy, he steadfastly refused to take the oath of supremacy of the Crown in the relationship between the kingdom and the church in England. More furthermore publicly refused to uphold Henry's annulment from Catherine. John Fisher, Bishop of Rochester, refused the oath along with More. The oath reads:

In addition to refusing to support the King's annulment or supremacy, More refused to sign the 1534 Oath of Succession confirming Anne's role as queen and the rights of their children to succession. More's fate was sealed. While he had no argument with the basic concept of succession as stated in the Act, the preamble of the Oath repudiated the authority of the Pope.

His enemies had enough evidence to have the King arrest him on treason. Four days later, Henry had More imprisoned in the Tower of London. There More prepared a devotional Dialogue of Comfort against Tribulation. While More was imprisoned in the Tower, Thomas Cromwell made several visits, urging More to take the oath, which he continued to refuse.

The charges of high treason related to More's violating the statutes as to the King's supremacy (malicious silence) and conspiring with Bishop John Fisher in this respect (malicious conspiracy) and, according to some sources, included asserting that Parliament did not have the right to proclaim the King's Supremacy over the English Church. One group of scholars believes that the judges dismissed the first two charges (malicious acts) and tried More only on the final one, but others strongly disagree.

Regardless of the specific charges, the indictment related to violation of the Treasons Act 1534 which declared it treason to speak against the King's Supremacy:

The trial was held on 1 July 1535, before a panel of judges that included the new Lord Chancellor, Sir Thomas Audley, as well as Anne Boleyn's uncle, Thomas Howard, 3rd Duke of Norfolk, her father Thomas Boleyn and her brother George Boleyn. Norfolk offered More the chance of the king's "gracious pardon" should he "reform his […] obstinate opinion". More responded that, although he had not taken the oath, he had never spoken out against it either and that his silence could be accepted as his "ratification and confirmation" of the new statutes.

Thus More was relying upon legal precedent and the maxim "qui tacet consentire videtur" ("one who keeps silent seems to consent"), understanding that he could not be convicted as long as he did not explicitly deny that the King was Supreme Head of the Church, and he therefore refused to answer all questions regarding his opinions on the subject.

Thomas Cromwell, at the time the most powerful of the King's advisors, brought forth Solicitor General Richard Rich to testify that More had, in his presence, denied that the King was the legitimate head of the Church. This testimony was characterised by More as being extremely dubious. Witnesses Richard Southwell and Mr. Palmer (a servant to Southwell) were also present and both denied having heard the details of the reported conversation. As More himself pointed out:

 Can it therefore seem likely to your Lordships, that I should in so weighty an Affair as this, act so unadvisedly, as to trust Mr. Rich, a Man I had always so mean an Opinion of, in reference to his Truth and Honesty, … that I should only impart to Mr. Rich the Secrets of my Conscience in respect to the King's Supremacy, the particular Secrets, and only Point about which I have been so long pressed to explain my self? which I never did, nor never would reveal; when the Act was once made, either to the King himself, or any of his Privy Councillors, as is well known to your Honours, who have been sent upon no other account at several times by his Majesty to me in the Tower. I refer it to your Judgments, my Lords, whether this can seem credible to any of your Lordships.

The jury took only fifteen minutes, however, to find More guilty.

After the jury's verdict was delivered and before his sentencing, More spoke freely of his belief that "no temporal man may be the head of the spirituality" (take over the role of the Pope). According to William Roper's account, More was pleading that the Statute of Supremacy was contrary to the Magna Carta, to Church laws and to the laws of England, attempting to void the entire indictment against him.
He was sentenced to be hanged, drawn, and quartered (the usual punishment for traitors who were not the nobility), but the King commuted this to execution by decapitation.

The execution took place on 6 July 1535 at Tower Hill. When he came to mount the steps to the scaffold, its frame seeming so weak that it might collapse, More is widely quoted as saying (to one of the officials): "I pray you, master Lieutenant, see me safe up and [for] my coming down, let me shift for my self"; while on the scaffold he declared "that he died the king's good servant, and God's first." After More had finished reciting the Miserere while kneeling, the executioner reportedly begged his pardon, then More rose up merrily, kissed him and gave him forgiveness.

Relics 

Another comment he is believed to have made to the executioner is that his beard was completely innocent of any crime, and did not deserve the axe; he then positioned his beard so that it would not be harmed. More asked that his foster/adopted daughter Margaret Clement (née Giggs) be given his headless corpse to bury. She was the only member of his family to witness his execution. He was buried at the Tower of London, in the chapel of St Peter ad Vincula in an unmarked grave. His head was fixed upon a pike over London Bridge for a month, according to the normal custom for traitors.

More's daughter Margaret later rescued the severed head. It is believed to rest in the Roper Vault of St Dunstan's Church, Canterbury, perhaps with the remains of Margaret and her husband's family. Some have claimed that the head is buried within the tomb erected for More in Chelsea Old Church.

Among other surviving relics is his hair shirt, presented for safe keeping by Margaret Clement. This was long in the custody of the community of Augustinian canonesses who until 1983 lived at the convent at Abbotskerswell Priory, Devon. Some sources, including one from 2004, claimed that the shirt, made of goat hair was then at the Martyr's church on the Weld family's estate in Chideock, Dorset. It is now preserved at Buckfast Abbey, near Buckfastleigh in Devon.

Scholarly and literary work

History of King Richard III 
Between 1512 and 1519 More worked on a History of King Richard III, which he never finished but which was published after his death. The History is a Renaissance biography, remarkable more for its literary skill and adherence to classical precepts than for its historical accuracy. Some consider it an attack on royal tyranny, rather than on Richard III himself or the House of York. More uses a more dramatic writing style than had been typical in medieval chronicles; Richard III is limned as an outstanding, archetypal tyrant—however, More was only seven years old when Richard III was killed at the Battle of Bosworth in 1485 so he had no first-hand, in-depth knowledge of him.

The History of King Richard III was written and published in both English and Latin, each written separately, and with information deleted from the Latin edition to suit a European readership. It greatly influenced William Shakespeare's play Richard III. Modern historians attribute the unflattering portraits of Richard III in both works to both authors' allegiance to the reigning Tudor dynasty that wrested the throne from Richard III in the Wars of the Roses. According to Caroline Barron, Archbishop John Morton, in whose household More had served as a page , had joined the 1483 Buckingham rebellion against Richard III, and Morton was probably one of those who influenced More's hostility towards the defeated king. Clements Markham asserts that the actual author of the chronicle was, in large part, Archbishop Morton himself and that More was simply copying, or perhaps translating, Morton's original material.

Utopia 

More's best known and most controversial work, Utopia, is a frame narrative written in Latin. More completed and theologian Erasmus published the book in Leuven in 1516, but it was only translated into English and published in his native land in 1551 (16 years after his execution), and the 1684 translation became the most commonly cited. More (also a character in the book) and the narrator/traveller, Raphael Hythlodaeus (whose name alludes both to the healer archangel Raphael, and 'speaker of nonsense', the surname's Greek meaning), discuss modern ills in Antwerp, as well as describe the political arrangements of the imaginary island country of Utopia (a Greek pun on 'ou-topos' [no place] and 'eu-topos' [good place]) among themselves as well as to Pieter Gillis and Hieronymus van Busleyden. Utopia's original edition included a symmetrical "Utopian alphabet" omitted by later editions, but which may have been an early attempt or precursor of shorthand.

Utopia contrasts the contentious social life of European states with the perfectly orderly, reasonable social arrangements of Utopia and its environs (Tallstoria, Nolandia, and Aircastle). In Utopia, there are no lawyers because of the laws' simplicity and because social gatherings are in public view (encouraging participants to behave well), communal ownership supplants private property, men and women are educated alike, and there is almost complete religious toleration (except for atheists, who are allowed but despised).

More may have used monastic communalism as his model, although other concepts he presents such as legalising euthanasia remain far outside Church doctrine. Hythlodaeus asserts that a man who refuses to believe in a god or an afterlife could never be trusted, because he would not acknowledge any authority or principle outside himself.

Some take the novel's principal message to be the social need for order and discipline rather than liberty. Ironically, Hythlodaeus, who believes philosophers should not get involved in politics, addresses More's ultimate conflict between his humanistic beliefs and courtly duties as the King's servant, pointing out that one day those morals will come into conflict with the political reality.

Utopia gave rise to a literary genre, Utopian and dystopian fiction, which features ideal societies or perfect cities, or their opposite. Early works influenced by Utopia included New Atlantis by Francis Bacon, Erewhon by Samuel Butler, and Candide by Voltaire. Although Utopianism combined classical concepts of perfect societies (Plato and Aristotle) with Roman rhetorical finesse (cf. Cicero, Quintilian, epideictic oratory), the Renaissance genre continued into the Age of Enlightenment and survives in modern science fiction.

Religious polemics 
In 1520 the reformer Martin Luther published three works in quick succession: An Appeal to the Christian Nobility of the German Nation (Aug.), Concerning the Babylonish Captivity of the Church (Oct.), and On the Liberty of a Christian Man (Nov.). In these books, Luther set out his doctrine of salvation through grace alone, rejected certain Catholic practices, and attacked abuses and excesses within the Catholic Church. In 1521, Henry VIII formally responded to Luther's criticisms with the Assertio, written with More's assistance. Pope Leo X rewarded the English king with the title "Fidei defensor" ("Defender of the Faith") for his work combating Luther's heresies.

Martin Luther then attacked Henry VIII in print, calling him a "pig, dolt, and liar". At the king's request, More composed a rebuttal: the Responsio ad Lutherum was published at the end of 1523. In the Responsio, More defended papal supremacy, the sacraments, and other Church traditions. More, though considered "a much steadier personality", described Luther as an "ape", a "drunkard", and a "lousy little friar" amongst other epithets. Writing under the pseudonym of Gulielmus Rosseus, More tells Luther that:

for as long as your reverend paternity will be determined to tell these shameless lies, others will be permitted, on behalf of his English majesty, to throw back into your paternity's shitty mouth, truly the shit-pool of all shit, all the muck and shit which your damnable rottenness has vomited up, and to empty out all the sewers and privies onto your crown divested of the dignity of the priestly crown, against which no less than the kingly crown you have determined to play the buffoon.

His saying is followed with a kind of apology to his readers, while Luther possibly never apologized for his sayings. Stephen Greenblatt argues, "More speaks for his ruler and in his opponent's idiom; Luther speaks for himself, and his scatological imagery far exceeds in quantity, intensity, and inventiveness anything that More could muster. If for More scatology normally expresses a communal disapproval, for Luther, it expresses a deep personal rage."

Confronting Luther confirmed More's theological conservatism. He thereafter avoided any hint of criticism of Church authority. In 1528, More published another religious polemic, A Dialogue Concerning Heresies, that asserted the Catholic Church was the one true church, established by Christ and the Apostles, and affirmed the validity of its authority, traditions and practices. In 1529, the circulation of Simon Fish's Supplication for the Beggars prompted More to respond with the Supplycatyon of Soulys.

In 1531, a year after More's father died, William Tyndale published An Answer unto Sir Thomas More's Dialogue in response to More's Dialogue Concerning Heresies. More responded with a half million words: the Confutation of Tyndale's Answer. The Confutation is an imaginary dialogue between More and Tyndale, with More addressing each of Tyndale's criticisms of Catholic rites and doctrines. More, who valued structure, tradition and order in society as safeguards against tyranny and error, vehemently believed that Lutheranism and the Protestant Reformation in general were dangerous, not only to the Catholic faith but to the stability of society as a whole.

Correspondence 
Most major humanists were prolific letter writers, and Thomas More was no exception. As in the case of his friend Erasmus of Rotterdam, however, only a small portion of his correspondence (about 280 letters) survived. These include everything from personal letters to official government correspondence (mostly in English), letters to fellow humanist scholars (in Latin), several epistolary tracts, verse epistles, prefatory letters (some fictional) to several of More's own works, letters to More's children and their tutors (in Latin), and the so-called "prison-letters" (in English) which he exchanged with his oldest daughter Margaret while he was imprisoned in the Tower of London awaiting execution. More also engaged in controversies, most notably with the French poet Germain de Brie, which culminated in the publication of de Brie's Antimorus (1519). Erasmus intervened, however, and ended the dispute.

More also wrote about more spiritual matters. They include: A Treatise on the Passion (a.k.a. Treatise on the Passion of Christ), A Treatise to Receive the Blessed Body (a.k.a. Holy Body Treaty), and De Tristitia Christi (a.k.a. The Agony of Christ). More handwrote the last in the Tower of London while awaiting his execution. This last manuscript, saved from the confiscation decreed by Henry VIII, passed by the will of his daughter Margaret to Spanish hands through Fray Pedro de Soto, confessor of Emperor Charles V. More's friend Luis Vives received it in Valencia, where it remains in the collection of Real Colegio Seminario del Corpus Christi museum.

Veneration

Catholic Church 
Pope Leo XIII beatified Thomas More, John Fisher, and 52 other English Martyrs on 29 December 1886. Pope Pius XI canonised More and Fisher on 19 May 1935, and More's feast day was established as 9 July. Since 1970 the General Roman Calendar has celebrated More with St John Fisher on 22 June (the date of Fisher's execution). On 31 October 2000 Pope John Paul II declared More "the heavenly Patron of Statesmen and Politicians". More is the patron of the German Catholic youth organisation Katholische Junge Gemeinde.

Anglican Communion 
In 1980, despite their opposition to the English Reformation, More and Fisher were added as martyrs of the reformation to the Church of England's calendar of "Saints and Heroes of the Christian Church", to be commemorated every 6 July (the date of More's execution) as "Thomas More, scholar, and John Fisher, Bishop of Rochester, Reformation Martyrs, 1535". The annual remembrance of 6 July, is recognized by all Anglican Churches in communion with Canterbury, including Australia, Brazil, Canada, and South Africa.

In an essay examining the events around the addition to the Anglican calendar, Scholar William Sheils links the reasoning for More's recognition to a "long-standing tradition hinted at in Rose Macaulay's ironic debating point of 1935 about More's status as an 'unschismed Anglican', a tradition also recalled in the annual memorial lecture held at St. Dunstan's Church in Canterbury, where More's head is said to be buried." Sheils also noted the influence of the 1960s popular play and film A Man for All Seasons which gave More a 'reputation as a defender of the right of conscience". Thanks to the play's depiction,  this "brought his life to a broader and more popular audience" with the film "extending its impact worldwide following the Oscar triumphs". Around this time the atheist Oxford historian and public intellectual, Hugh Trevor-Roper held More up as "the first great Englishman whom we feel that we know, the most saintly of Humanists...the universal man of our cool northern Renaissance." By 1978, the quincentenary of More's birth Trevor-Roper wrote an essay putting More in the Renaissance Platonist tradition, and claim his reputation was "quite independent of his Catholicism." (Only, later on, did a more critical view arise in academia, led by Professor Sir Geoffrey Elton, which "challenged More's reputation for saintliness by focusing on his dealings with heretics, the ferocity of which, in fairness to him, More did not deny. In this research, More's role as a prosecutor, or persecutor, of dissidents has been at the center of the debate.")

Legacy 

The steadfastness and courage with which More maintained his religious convictions, and his dignity during his imprisonment, trial, and execution, contributed much to More's posthumous reputation, particularly among Roman Catholics. His friend Erasmus defended More's character as "more pure than any snow" and described his genius as "such as England never had and never again will have." Upon learning of More's execution, Emperor Charles V said: "Had we been master of such a servant, we would rather have lost the best city of our dominions than such a worthy councillor."

G. K. Chesterton, a Roman Catholic convert from the Church of England, predicted More "may come to be counted the greatest Englishman, or at least the greatest historical character in English history." Hugh Trevor-Roper called More "the first great Englishman whom we feel that we know, the most saintly of humanists, the most human of saints, the universal man of our cool northern renaissance."

Jonathan Swift, an Anglican, wrote that More was "a person of the greatest virtue this kingdom ever produced". Some consider this quote to be of Samuel Johnson, although it's not found in Johnson's writings. The metaphysical poet John Donne, also honoured as a hero by Anglicans, was More's great-great-nephew. US Senator Eugene McCarthy had a portrait of More in his office.

Roman Catholic scholars maintain that More used irony in Utopia, and that he remained an orthodox Christian. Marxist theoreticians such as Karl Kautsky considered the book a critique of economic and social exploitation in pre-modern Europe and More is claimed to have influenced the development of socialist ideas.

In 1963, Moreana, an academic journal focusing on analysis of More and his writings, was founded.

In 2002, More was placed at number 37 in the BBC's poll of the 100 Greatest Britons.

In literature and popular culture 
William Roper's biography of More was one of the first biographies in Modern English.

Sir Thomas More is a play written circa 1592 in collaboration between Henry Chettle, Anthony Munday, William Shakespeare, and others. In it More is portrayed as a wise and honest statesman. The original manuscript has survived as a handwritten text that shows many revisions by its several authors, as well as the censorious influence of Edmund Tylney, Master of the Revels in the government of Queen Elizabeth I. The script has since been published and has had several productions.

The 20th-century agnostic playwright Robert Bolt portrayed Thomas More as the tragic hero of his 1960 play A Man for All Seasons. The title is drawn from what Robert Whittington in 1520 wrote of More:

More is a man of an angel's wit and singular learning. I know not his fellow. For where is the man of that gentleness, lowliness and affability? And, as time requireth, a man of marvelous mirth and pastimes, and sometime of as sad gravity. A man for all seasons.

In 1966, the play A Man for All Seasons was adapted into a film with the same title. It was directed by Fred Zinnemann and adapted for the screen by the playwright. It stars Paul Scofield, a noted British actor, who said that the part of Sir Thomas More was "the most difficult part I played." The film won the Academy Award for Best Picture and Scofield won the Best Actor Oscar. In 1988 Charlton Heston starred in and directed a made-for-television film that restored the character of "the common man" that had been cut from the 1966 film.

In the 1969 film Anne of the Thousand Days, More is portrayed by actor William Squire.

Catholic science fiction writer R. A. Lafferty wrote his novel Past Master as a modern equivalent to More's Utopia, which he saw as a satire. In this novel, Thomas More travels through time to the year 2535, where he is made king of the world "Astrobe", only to be beheaded after ruling for a mere nine days. One character compares More favourably to almost every other major historical figure: "He had one completely honest moment right at the end. I cannot think of anyone else who ever had one."

Karl Zuchardt's novel, Stirb du Narr! ("Die you fool!"), about More's struggle with King Henry, portrays More as an idealist bound to fail in the power struggle with a ruthless ruler and an unjust world.

In her 2009 novel Wolf Hall, its 2012 sequel Bring Up the Bodies, and the final book of the trilogy, her 2020 The Mirror and the Light, the novelist Hilary Mantel portrays More (from the perspective of a sympathetically portrayed Thomas Cromwell) as an unsympathetic persecutor of Protestants and an ally of the Habsburg empire.

Literary critic James Wood in his book The Broken Estate, a collection of essays, is critical of More and refers to him as "cruel in punishment, evasive in argument, lusty for power, and repressive in politics".

Aaron Zelman's non-fiction book The State Versus the People includes a comparison of Utopia with Plato's Republic. Zelman is undecided as to whether More was being ironic in his book or was genuinely advocating a police state. Zelman comments, "More is the only Christian saint to be honoured with a statue at the Kremlin." By this Zelman implies that Utopia influenced Vladimir Lenin's Bolsheviks, despite their brutal repression of religion.

Other biographers, such as Peter Ackroyd, have offered a more sympathetic picture of More as both a sophisticated philosopher and man of letters, as well as a zealous Catholic who believed in the authority of the Holy See over Christendom.

The protagonist of Walker Percy's novels, Love in the Ruins and The Thanatos Syndrome, is "Dr Thomas More", a reluctant Catholic and descendant of More.

More is the focus of the Al Stewart song "A Man For All Seasons" from the 1978 album Time Passages, and of the Far song "Sir", featured on the limited editions and 2008 re-release of their 1994 album Quick. In addition, the song "So Says I" by indie rock outfit The Shins alludes to the socialist interpretation of More's Utopia.

Jeremy Northam depicts More in the television series The Tudors as a peaceful man, as well as a devout Roman Catholic and loving family patriarch. He also shows More loathing Protestantism, burning both Martin Luther's books and English Protestants who have been convicted of heresy. The portrayal has unhistorical aspects, such as that More neither personally caused nor attended Simon Fish's execution (since Fish actually died of bubonic plague in 1531 before he could stand trial), although More's The Supplication of Souls, published in October 1529, addressed Fish's Supplication for the Beggars. Indeed, there is no evidence that More ever attended the execution of any heretic. The series also neglected to show More's avowed insistence that Richard Rich's testimony about More disputing the King's title as Supreme Head of the Church of England was perjured.

More is depicted by Andrew Buchan in the television series The Spanish Princess.

In the years 1968–2007 the University of San Francisco's Gleeson Library Associates awarded the annual Sir Thomas More Medal for Book Collecting to private book collectors of note, including Elmer Belt, Otto Schaefer, Albert Sperisen, John S. Mayfield and Lord Wardington.

Institutions named after More

Communism, socialism and resistance to communism 
Having been praised "as a Communist hero by Karl Marx, Friedrich Engels, and Karl Kautsky" because of the Communist attitude to property in his Utopia, under Soviet Communism the name of Thomas More was in ninth position from the top of Moscow's Stele of Freedom (also known as the Obelisk of Revolutionary Thinkers), as one of the most influential thinkers "who promoted the liberation of humankind from oppression, arbitrariness, and exploitation." This monument was erected in 1918 in Aleksandrovsky Garden near the Kremlin at Lenin's suggestion.

The Great Soviet Encyclopedia'''s English translation (1979) described More as "the founder of Utopian socialism", the first person "to describe a society in which private property ... had been abolished" (a society in which the family was "a cell for the communist way of life"), and a thinker who "did not believe that the ideal society would be achieved through revolution", but who "greatly influenced reformers of subsequent centuries, especially Morelly, G. Babeuf, Saint-Simon, C. Fourier, E. Cabet, and other representatives of Utopian socialism."Utopia also inspired socialists such as William Morris.

Many see More's communism or socialism as purely satirical. In 1888, while praising More's communism, Karl Kautsky pointed out that "perplexed" historians and economists often saw the name Utopia (which means "no place") as "a subtle hint by More that he himself regarded his communism as an impracticable dream".

Aleksandr Solzhenitsyn, the Russian Nobel Prize-winning, anti-Communist author of The Gulag Archipelago, argued that Soviet communism needed enslavement and forced labour to survive, and that this had been " ...foreseen as far back as Thomas More, the great-grandfather of socialism, in his Utopia".<ref name="Bloom01a">{{cite book|author1=Bloom, Harold|url=https://books.google.com/books?id=s-sVN2COG78C&q=%22Solzhenitsyn+insists+that+the+Soviet+system+cannot+survive+without+the+camps%22+%22Thomas+More%22+%22the+great-grandfather+of+socialism%22&pg=PA173|title=Enslavement Enslavement and Emancipation] and Emancipation|author2=Hobby, Blake|date=2010|publisher=Infobase Publishing|isbn=978-1-60413-441-4|pages=173–174|quote=Moreover, Solzhenitsyn insists that the Soviet system cannot survive without the camps, that Soviet communism requires enslavement and forced labour. " ...foreseen as far back as Thomas More, the great-grandfather of socialism, in his Utopia [,the] labor of zeks was needed for degrading and particularly heavy work, which no one, under socialism, would wish to perform" (Gulag, Vol 3." 578).|author-link1=Harold Bloom|access-date=20 January 2015}}</ref>

In 2008, More was portrayed on stage in Hong Kong as an allegorical symbol of the pan-democracy camp resisting the Chinese Communist Party in a translated and modified version of Robert Bolt's play A Man for All Seasons.

Historic sites

Westminster Hall 
A plaque in the middle of the floor of London's Westminster Hall commemorates More's trial for treason and condemnation to execution in that original part of the Palace of Westminster. The building, which houses Parliament, would have been well known to More, who served several terms as a member and became Speaker of the House of Commons before his appointment as England's Lord Chancellor.

Beaufort House

As More's royal duties frequently required his attendance at the king's Thames-side palaces in both Richmond and Greenwich, it was convenient to select a riverside property situated between them (the common method of transport being by boat) for his home. In about 1520 he purchased a parcel of land comprising "undisturbed wood and pasture", stretching from the Thames in Chelsea to the present-day King's Road. There he caused to be built a dignified red-brick mansion (known simply as More's house or Chelsea House) in which he lived until his arrest in 1534.  In the bawdy poem The Twelve Mery Jestes of Wyddow Edyth, written in 1525 by a member of More's household (or even by More himself) using the pseudonym of "Walter Smith", the widow arrives by boat at "Chelsay…where she had best cheare of all/in the house of Syr Thomas More."

Upon More's arrest the estate was confiscated, coming into the possession of the Comptroller of the Royal Household, William Paulet.

In 1682, the property was renamed Beaufort House after 1st Duke of Beaufort, a new owner.

Crosby Hall 

In June 1523 More bought the "very large and beautiful" Crosby Place (Crosby Hall) in Bishopsgate, London, but this was not a simple transaction: eight months later he sold the property (never having lived there) at a considerable profit to his friend and business partner Antonio Bonvisi who, in turn, leased it back to More's son-in-law William Roper and nephew William Rastell; possibly this was an agreed means of dealing with a debt between More and Bonvisi. Because of this the Crown did not confiscate the property after More's execution.

Chelsea Old Church 

Across a small park and Old Church Street from Crosby Hall is Chelsea Old Church, an Anglican church whose southern chapel More commissioned and in which he sang with the parish choir. Except for his chapel, the church was largely destroyed in the Second World War and rebuilt in 1958. The capitals on the medieval arch connecting the chapel to the main sanctuary display symbols associated with More and his office. On the southern wall of the sanctuary is the tomb and epitaph he erected for himself and his wives, detailing his ancestry and accomplishments in Latin, including his role as peacemaker between the various Christian European states as well as a curiously altered portion about his curbing heresy. When More served Mass, he would leave by the door just to the left of it. He is not, however, buried here, nor is it entirely certain which of his family may be. It is open to the public at specific times. Outside the church, facing the River Thames, is a statue by L. Cubitt Bevis erected in 1969, commemorating More as "saint", "scholar", and "statesman"; the back displays his coat-of-arms. Nearby, on Upper Cheyne Row, the Roman Catholic Church of Our Most Holy Redeemer & St. Thomas More honours the martyr.

Tower Hill 
A plaque and small garden commemorate the famed execution site on Tower Hill, London, just outside the Tower of London, as well as all those executed there, many as religious martyrs or as prisoners of conscience. More's corpse, minus his head, was unceremoniously buried in an unmarked mass grave beneath the Royal Chapel of St. Peter Ad Vincula, within the walls of the Tower of London, as was the custom for traitors executed at Tower Hill. The chapel is accessible to Tower visitors.

St Katharine Docks 
Thomas More is commemorated by a stone plaque near St Katharine Docks, just east of the Tower where he was executed. The street in which it is situated was formerly called Nightingale Lane, a corruption of "Knighten Guild", derived from the original owners of the land. It is now renamed Thomas More Street in his honour.

St Dunstan's Church and Roper House, Canterbury 
St Dunstan's Church, an Anglican parish church in Canterbury, possesses More's head, rescued by his daughter Margaret Roper, whose family lived in Canterbury down and across the street from their parish church. A stone immediately to the left of the altar marks the sealed Roper family vault beneath the Nicholas Chapel, itself to the right of the church's sanctuary or main altar. St Dunstan's Church has carefully investigated, preserved and sealed this burial vault. The last archaeological investigation revealed that the suspected head of More rests in a niche separate from the other bodies, possibly from later interference. Displays in the chapel record the archaeological findings in pictures and narratives. Roman Catholics donated stained glass to commemorate the events in More's life. A small plaque marks the former home of William and Margaret Roper; another house nearby and entitled Roper House is now a home for deaf people.

Works 
Note: The reference "CW" is to the relevant volume of the Yale Edition of the Complete Works of St. Thomas More (New Haven and London 1963–1997)

Published during More's life (with dates of publication) 
 A Merry Jest (c. 1516) (CW 1)
 Utopia (1516) (CW 4)
 Latin Poems (1518, 1520) (CW 3, Pt.2)
 Letter to Brixius (1520) (CW 3, Pt. 2, App C)
 Responsio ad Lutherum (The Answer to Luther, 1523) (CW 5)
 A Dialogue Concerning Heresies (1529, 1530) (CW 6)
 Supplication of Souls (1529) (CW 7)
 Letter Against Frith (1532) (CW 7) pdf
 The Confutation of Tyndale's Answer (1532, 1533) (CW 8) Books 1–4, Books 5–9
 Apology (1533) (CW 9)
 Debellation of Salem and Bizance (1533) (CW 10) pdf
 The Answer to a Poisoned Book (1533) (CW 11) pdf

Published after More's death (with likely dates of composition) 
 The History of King Richard III (c. 1513–1518) (CW 2 & 15)
 The Four Last Things (c. 1522) (CW 1)
 A Dialogue of Comfort Against Tribulation (1534) (CW 12)
 Treatise Upon the Passion (1534) (CW 13)
 Treatise on the Blessed Body (1535) (CW 13)
 Instructions and Prayers (1535) (CW 13)
 De Tristitia Christi (1535) (CW 14) (preserved in the Real Colegio Seminario del Corpus Christi, Valencia)

Translations 
 Translations of Lucian (many dates 1506–1534) (CW 3, Pt.1)
 The Life of Pico della Mirandola, by Gianfrancesco Pico della Mirandola (c. 1510) (CW 1)

Notes

Sources

Biographies 
 
 
  (Note: this is a 2009 translation (from the original German, by Hector de Cavilla) of Berglar's 1978 work Die Stunde des Thomas Morus – Einer gegen die Macht. Freiburg 1978; Adamas-Verlag, Köln 1998)
 
 Brémond, Henri (1904) – Le Bienheureux Thomas More 1478–1535 (1904) as Sir Thomas More (1913) translated by Henry Child;
 1920 edition published by R. & T. Washbourne Limited, ;
 published in French in Paris by Gabalda, 1920, 
(Note: Brémond is frequently cited in Berglar (2009))
 
 
 
 
 

 
 
 
 

 
 
 
 
 

 .

Historiography 
 .
 .
 Miles, Leland. “Persecution and the Dialogue of Comfort: A Fresh Look at the Charges against Thomas More.” Journal of British Studies, vol. 5, no. 1, 1965, pp. 19–30. online

Primary sources 
 .
 
 .
 .
 .
 .

External links 

 
 
The Center for Thomas More Studies at the University of Dallas
 Thomas More Studies database : contains several of More's English works, including dialogues, early poetry and letters, as well as journal articles and biographical material
 
 
 
 . Presents a critical view of More's anti-Protestantism
 More and The History of Richard III
 .
 Thomas More and Utopias – a learning resource from the British Library
 .
The Essential Works of Thomas More – The Center for Thomas More Studies at the University of Dallas
 
 Patron Saints Index entry – Saint Thomas More biography, prayers, quotes, Catholic devotions to him.
 Trial of Sir Thomas More, Professor Douglas O. Linder, University of Missouri-Kansas City (UMKC) School of Law
 John Fisher and Thomas More: Martyrs of England and Wales
 

1478 births
1535 deaths
16th-century Christian saints
16th-century male writers
16th-century English historians
16th-century Latin-language writers
16th-century English novelists
16th-century Roman Catholic martyrs
British writers in Latin
Chancellors of the Duchy of Lancaster
Christian humanists
16th-century English philosophers
English Catholic poets
English non-fiction writers
English religious writers
English Renaissance humanists
English Roman Catholic saints
English saints
Executed philosophers
Executed writers
Executions at the Tower of London
Creators of writing systems
Lord chancellors of England
Members of Lincoln's Inn
Members of the Privy Council of England
People educated at Magdalen College School, Oxford
People associated with the University of Oxford
Christian martyrs executed by decapitation
People executed under the Tudors for treason against England
People from the City of London
Prisoners in the Tower of London
Catholic philosophers
Roman Catholic writers
Early modern Christian devotional writers
Canonizations by Pope Pius XI
Authors of utopian literature
Members of the Third Order of Saint Francis
Franciscan martyrs
Franciscan saints
People executed by Tudor England by decapitation
Executed people from London
People executed under Henry VIII
English MPs 1504
English MPs 1510
English MPs 1523
Speakers of the House of Commons of England
Members of the Parliament of England for the City of London
Burials at the Church of St Peter ad Vincula
More family
British male poets
English male novelists
English politicians convicted of crimes
Catholic martyrs of England and Wales
Proto-socialists
Anglican saints
16th-century socialists